This article presents official statistics gathered during the COVID-19 pandemic in Singapore.

The Ministry of Health of Singapore has been publishing official numbers on a daily basis since the first confirmed case of SARS-CoV-2 virus on 23 January 2020. In their situation reports, the cases are broken down into several categories: imported cases, non-imported community cases, non-imported dormitory cases. Prior to 16 April 2020, MOH had released the data only at the end of the day. However upon discovery of a civil servant leaking information before the official release of data, since 17 April 2020, MOH has been providing a preliminary update of summarised figures at around noon of each day with the details released at the end of the day.

Classifying COVID-19 cases 
Singapore adheres strictly to World Health Organization's case definition for classifying COVID-19 deaths, which does not include non-pneumonia fatalities like those caused by blood or heart issues among COVID-19 patients in its official tally. This was exemplified in three cases which the cause of death was recorded as either ischaemic heart disease or heart attack, and a suicide committed by an Indian migrant worker who was tested positive for the virus.

Untraced cases prior to 11 April 2020

Charts 
The linear plot shows the total number of cases as a function of time (by date) since 23 January 2020, the date of the first reported case in Singapore, while the graph plotted on a logarithmic scale, or a semi-log plot, shows an exponential growth in the number of cases as a straight line on the graph. In the logarithmic scale plot, the slope of the straight line determines the rate of growth of the number of cases, with a steeper slope representing a higher growth rate. The third and fourth plot shows the number of daily new cases and total active cases respectively as reported.

Overview

Cases per day

Active cases per day

Recoveries per day

Deaths per day

Total tests performed 
The linear plot shows the total number of tests performed as a function of time (by date) from 7 April 2020, the date of the first testing data given in Singapore.

Cumulative number of cases, hospitalizations, ICU admissions, recoveries and deaths

Notes

References 

2020 in Singapore
2021 in Singapore
COVID-19 pandemic in Singapore
COVID-19
COVID-19
Singapore